The 2013 United Football League was the fourth season of the UFL since its establishment as a semi-professional league in 2009.

Global FC are the defending champions, having won the previous Division 1 of the 2012 United Football League season. The season features 9 teams from the 2012 United Football League Division 1 and one new team promoted from the 2012 United Football League Division 2. Pachanga Diliman replaced the relegated Navy. The 2013 Division 1 league play kicked off on February 5, 2013  while the Division 2 scheduled to kick off its first match between Dolphins United and Cebu Queen City United on February 9, 2013 at the Emperador Stadium  but Cebu Queen City United did not show up in the game time.

Stallion FC clinched the United Football League Division 1 championship after Kaya came away with a 3-2 victory against Global at the Emperador Stadium in Mckinley Hill in Taguig June 13, 2013.

Teams

Ten teams in Division 1 and Division 2 contest for this years' league title. Pachanga Diliman from 2012 UFL Division 2 to replace relegated Navy. Two 2012 UFL Division 2 sides Manila Lions and Sunken Garden United did not participate in this year's league contest after they finished 11th and 12th spot respectively in 2012 league season.

On March 1, 2013, the UFL management has officially ruled out Cebu Queen City United from participating after the club apparently withdrawn  when the club’s request for home games was turned down by the league.

Clubs by division

Managerial changes

Venues

League table and results

Division 1

Division 2

Promotion-relegation playoffs
Philippine Army, the 9th-placed team of Division 1 will face the 2nd-placed 2013 UFL Division 2 side Union Internacional Manila in a two-legged playoff. The winner on aggregate score after both matches will earn a spot in the 2014 UFL Division 1.

1st Leg

2nd Leg

Philippine Army won 8–4 on aggregate and retained its United Football League Division 1 spot for the 2014 season.

Top goalscorers
Correct as of 23:00, June 20, 2013Source: UFL Phil

Own goals

Hat-tricks

 ‡ Player scored more than three goals

Scoring

Division 1
First goal of the season: Relan Bretaña for Philippine Army against Loyola (February 5, 2013)
Fastest goal of the season: 1 Minute – Mark Hartmann for Loyola against Philippine Air Force (February 21, 2013) and Agbayomi Olowoyeye for Green Archers United against Philippine Army (May 18, 2013)
First own goal of the season: 50 Minutes – Bafio Magassa of Manila Nomads for Global (February 14, 2013)
Widest winning margin: 9 goals
Loyola Meralco Sparks 10–1 Philippine Army  (April 16, 2013)
Highest scoring game: 11 goals
Loyola Meralco Sparks 10–1 Philippine Army  (April 16, 2013)
Most goals scored in a match by a single team: 10 goals
Loyola Meralco Sparks 10–1 Philippine Army  (April 16, 2013)
Most goals scored in a match by a losing team: 4 goals
Philippine Army 4–5 PSG (June 17, 2013)

Division 2
First goal of the season:  Own goal by Manila All-Japan player Yuki Itoyama scored for Cimarron (February 10, 2013)
Fastest goal of the season: 1 Minute – Mohammad Ghasemi for Laos against Dolphins United (May 26, 2013)
First own goal of the season: 6 Minutes – Yuki Itoyama of Manila All-Japan for Cimarron (February 10, 2013)
Widest winning margin: 7 goals
Team Socceroo 8–1 Laos (June 20, 2013)
Highest scoring game: 9 goals
Forza 4–5 Team Socceroo (May 26, 2013)
Team Socceroo 8–1 Laos (June 20, 2013)
Most goals scored in a match by a single team: 8 goals
Team Socceroo 8–1 Laos (June 20, 2013)
Most goals scored in a match by a losing team: 4 goals
Forza 4–5 Team Socceroo (May 26, 2013)

Season Awards

Team Awards
The following teams are awarded by the United Football League in the ceremony.

Individual awards
The following players are awarded by the United Football League Committee in the ceremony.

References

External links
Official website

 
United Football League (Philippines) seasons
1
Phil
Phil